Vovlada (also, Vavada, Vavlada, and Vovada) is a village in the Astara Rayon of Azerbaijan.  The village forms part of the municipality of Lomin. Vovlada in Astara (region) is a town located in Azerbaijan, about 145 miles (or 233 kilometers) South-West of Baku, the country's capital town.

References

External links 

Populated places in Astara District